The Palestine Academy for Science and Technology (PALAST) is an Academy  of science hedquarted in Jerusalem, Palestine. It was founded in 1997.

References

National academies of sciences
Palestine Academy for Science and Technology

External links